Domenico Pasquini (1740–June 29, 1798) was an Italian painter, active in Poland and Russia, where he painted a portrait of Catherine the Great. He was a pupil of Giovanni Battista Tiepolo in Venice. He died in Italy 1798

Sources

1740 births
1798 deaths
Painters from Venice
18th-century Italian painters
Italian male painters
18th-century Italian male artists